Truxtun Historic District is a national historic district located at Portsmouth, Virginia. It encompasses 241 contributing buildings in a primarily residential section of Portsmouth.  It was developed between 1918 and 1920 as a planned community of Colonial Revival style single family residences.  It was developed by the United States Housing Corporation as a result of the rapid influx of workers at the Norfolk Naval Shipyard during World War I.  It was the first wartime government housing project constructed exclusively for African-American residents. In 1921 the Federal Government sold it off.

It was listed on the National Register of Historic Places in 1982.

References

African-American history of Virginia
Historic districts on the National Register of Historic Places in Virginia
Colonial Revival architecture in Virginia
Buildings and structures in Portsmouth, Virginia
National Register of Historic Places in Portsmouth, Virginia